Kazimierz Neumann (23 November 1933 – 16 July 2011) was a Polish rower. He competed in the men's coxless four event at the 1960 Summer Olympics.

References

1933 births
2011 deaths
Polish male rowers
Olympic rowers of Poland
Rowers at the 1960 Summer Olympics
Sportspeople from Toruń